Peter Brown (1837 – 10 September 1894) was a Swedish recipient of the Victoria Cross, the highest and most prestigious award for gallantry in the face of the enemy that can be awarded to British and Commonwealth forces.

Details
Brown was approximately 42 years old, and a Trooper in the Cape Mounted Riflemen, Cape Colonial Forces during the Morosi's Mountain 1879 Campaign when, on 8 April 1879 during the assault on Morosi's Mountain, South Africa, Trooper Brown spent all day carrying water to his wounded comrades who were lying under rocks where they had taken shelter. He did this within 200 yards of the enemy who were firing from redoubts up the sides of the mountain and he was severely wounded during the day, his forearm was shattered and he was also hit in the leg. Nevertheless, he did not cease his efforts until his water bottle was shot through and became useless.

The published citation read:

Death
He died at his home in Cape Town from Bright's disease.

References

Monuments to Courage (David Harvey, 1999)
The Register of the Victoria Cross (This England, 1997)
Moorosi: A South African king's battle for survival (Graham Fysh)

1837 births
1894 deaths
British colonial army soldiers
Swedish emigrants to South Africa
People of the Basuto Gun War
Deaths from kidney disease
Recipients of the Victoria Cross